Pholage is an artistic technique and method of graphic reproduction  invented by Manuel Bennett in 1959.

An extension of collage, instead of consisting of mounting numerous pieces of colored paper or other material to make one original, pholage consists of taking positive or negative photographic film images, cutting out sections called "masks", and reassembling them to create a varied reproduction of the original.  Additional drawings can be added to the color-separated original to further manipulate the original.

While collage yields a single piece of art, pholage can be reproduced by exposing photosensitive paper through the mask, or any other reproductive technique.

See also
 Art movement
 Creativity techniques
 List of art media
 List of artistic media
 List of art movements
 List of most expensive paintings
 List of most expensive sculptures
 List of art techniques
 List of sculptors
 Scanner art (scanner collage)

Artistic techniques
Decorative arts